XHPO-FM is a radio station on 103.9 FM in Acapulco, Guerrero. It is owned by Grupo Audiorama.

History

XHPO received its concession on November 28, 1988.

References

Radio stations in Guerrero
Radio stations established in 1988